State Road 240 in the U.S. state of Indiana is a short connector route in located in eastern Putnam County.

Route description
State Road 240 begins in Greencastle at U.S. Route 231 and travels east, leaving the Greencastle city limits after about 3 miles.  At mile 9.18 it hits the county line between Putnam and Hendricks counties, and travels along this line until it reaches State Road 75 just north of its intersection with U.S. Route 40.  This road provides a direct route from Greencastle toward Indianapolis.

Major intersections

References

 Indiana Highway Ends - SR 240

External links

240
Transportation in Putnam County, Indiana